Umespirone (KC-9172) is a drug of the azapirone class which possesses anxiolytic and antipsychotic properties. It behaves as a 5-HT1A receptor partial agonist (Ki = 15 nM), D2 receptor partial agonist (Ki = 23 nM), and α1-adrenoceptor receptor antagonist (Ki = 14 nM), and also has weak affinity for the sigma receptor (Ki = 558 nM). Unlike many other anxiolytics and antipsychotics, umespirone produces minimal sedation, cognitive/memory impairment, catalepsy, and extrapyramidal symptoms.

Synthesis

The condensation between ethyl cyanoacetate (1) and acetone gives ethylisopropylidenecyanoacetate [759-58-0] (2). This product is reacted with N-butylcyanoacetamide [39581-21-0] (3) in sodium methoxide solution to give N-butyl-2,4-dicyano-3,3-dimethylglutarimide, CID:10681941 (4). The glutarimide is cyclized with phosphoric acid to yield 3-butyl-9,9-dimethyl-3,7-diazabicyclo[3.3.1]nonane-2,4,6,8-tetraone, https://pubchem.ncbi.nlm.nih.gov/compound/10825633 CID:10825633 (5). 

The reaction between 1-(o-anisyl)piperazine [35386-24-4] (6) and 1,4-dibromobutane [110-52-1] (7) gives the Quat salt CID:15895413(8).  

Convergent synthesis (in the presence of potassium carbonate) affords  (KC-9172) (9).

See also 
 Azapirone

References 

Azapirones
N-(2-methoxyphenyl)piperazines